Charles Moulton may refer to:

 William Moulton Marston (1893–1947), pen name Charles Moulton, American psychologist, lawyer, inventor, and comic book writer who created the character Wonder Woman
 Charles Wells Moulton (1859–1913), American poet, critic, and editor
 Charles Moulton (choreographer) (born 1954), American choreographer and visual artist